Vitulazio is a comune (municipality) in the Province of Caserta in the Italian region Campania, located about  north of Naples and about  northwest of Caserta.

Vitulazio borders the following municipalities: Bellona, Camigliano, Capua, Grazzanise, Pastorano, Pignataro Maggiore.

References

External links
 Official website

Cities and towns in Campania